Mustapha Khaznadar (1817–1878), born as Georgios Halkias Stravelakis was a Tunisian politician who served as Prime Minister of the Beylik of Tunis from 1855 to 1873. He was one of the most influential people in modern Tunisian history.

Biography

Early life
Mustapha Khaznadar was born in the village of Kardamyla on the Greek island of Chios as Georgios Halkias Stravelakis in 1817. In January 1822, rebels from the neighboring islands of Samos arrived on Chios and declared their independence from the Ottoman Empire, the Ottoman sultan soon sent an army of about 40,000 to the island of Chios, where roughly 52,000 Greek inhabitants were massacred and tens of thousands of women and children were taken into slavery. During the Chios massacre, Georgios's father, the sailor Stephanis Halkias Stravelakis, was killed, while Georgios along with his brother Yannis were captured and sold into slavery by the Ottomans. He was then taken to Smyrna and then Constantinople, where he was sold as a slave to an envoy of the Husainid Dynasty.

Religious conversion and political career
The young Georgios was taken by the family of Mustapha Bey, and was renamed Mustapha. Later, he was passed to his son Ahmad I Bey while he was still crown prince. The young Mustapha now worked first as the prince's private treasurer before becoming Ahmad's state treasurer (Khaznadar). He managed to climb to the highest offices of the Tunisian state, married Princess Lalla Kalthoum in 1839 and was promoted to lieutenant-general of the army, made bey in 1840 and then speaker of the Grand Council from 1862 to 1878. In 1864, Mustapha Khaznadar, then Prime Minister, in an effort to raise the taxation of the Tunisian peasants to meet the demands of the Ottoman Empire he faced a rebellion, known as the Mejba Revolt, that almost overthrew the regime. However, the government was swift to act and ultimately suppressed the uprising. 
Mustafa Khaznadar retained memories of his Greek origin  and when he finally managed, he made contact with his remaining family, and helped to pay for the education of his two (Greek) nephews. Khaznadar died in 1878 and is buried in the mausoleum of Tourbet el Bey, in the heart of the Medina of Tunis.

Gallery

Honours
  Officer of the Order of the Blood (Nichan Dam) of Tunisia (1856)
  Officer of the Order of Glory (Nichan Iftikhar) of Tunisia

See also
Chios Massacre
Greek Muslims
Prime Minister of Tunisia
The Mejba Revolt
Mahmoud Ben Ayed

References

Notes

Sources

External Links 

1817 births
1878 deaths
Politicians from Chios
Former Greek Orthodox Christians
Greek slaves from the Ottoman Empire
Converts to Islam from Eastern Orthodoxy
People from the Ottoman Empire of Greek descent
Greek former Christians
Prime Ministers of Tunisia
Greek Muslims